The 1930 Northwestern Wildcats team represented Northwestern University during the 1930 college football season. The Wildcats compiled a 7–1 record (5–0 against Big Ten Conference opponents), tied with Michigan for the Big Ten championship, and outscored their opponents by a combined total of 182 to 36.

Schedule

References

Northwestern
Northwestern Wildcats football seasons
Big Ten Conference football champion seasons
Northwestern Wildcats football